Maidens is a village in the Kirkoswald parish of Ayrshire, Scotland. Situated on the coast of the Firth of Clyde at the southern end of Maidenhead Bay, a series of rocks known as the "Maidens” form a natural harbour. It formerly had its own railway station on the Maidens and Dunure Light Railway. In 1991, Maidens had a population of 567.

References

External links
Video footage of Maidens Harbour

Villages in Carrick, Scotland